Ossan is a community/status group of Muslims in Kerala, south India. The Ossan men were the traditional barbers and circumcisers among the Muslims of the central Malabar Coast (northern Kerala). The Ossan women were experts in pre- and post-delivery care of pregnant women (midwifery). The Ossans formed the lowest rank in the Kerala Muslim community "hierarchy", and were an indispensable part of the village community of Muslims of Kerala.

It is speculated that the original form of the title Ossan is "Otthaan", derived from the Arabic word Khatthaan meaning an expert practitioner of circumcision.

The Ossans were formerly considered as a low status group among the Muslims of Kerala. Ossan community is still figured as a financially backward group among some of the Muslim families in Kerala. Matrimonial alliances with financially elite Muslim families are rare in some parts of Kerala.

See also

Hajjam

References

Social groups of Kerala
Muslim communities of India
Muslim communities of Kerala
Islam in Kerala